The B. Coming is the third studio album by Philadelphia rapper Beanie Sigel.

Background and release 
It was supposed to be released between 2002 and 2004 under Roc-A-Fella Records and distributed by Def Jam Recordings. However, due to Jay-Z's takeover of Roc-A-Fella and presidency of Def Jam, Sigel left the label to join co-founder Damon Dash's newly-founded Dame Dash Music Group, where the album was released on March 29, 2005. The B. Coming contains 15 songs, with special guests including Freeway, Redman, Snoop Dogg, Bun B, Jay-Z, Cam'ron, and others. The album was completed before Beanie served a federal prison sentence in mid-2004.

Reception

Critical

At Metacritic, which assigns a normalized rating out of 100 to reviews from professional publications, the album received an average score of 73 out of 100 based on 14 reviews.

On AllMusic, reviewer David Jeffries stated "One thing to know is that it's not a linear journal. Instead, it consists of fragments from here and there that deal very little with situations and more with mindsets. [...] Those looking for a direct story of how Beanie earned three years in the clink will be somewhat disappointed, but these chunks of insight into the man's turmoil -- and the couple party tunes that go with them -- add up to one hell of an album." Whilst, Entertainment Weekly stated that the albums "finds [Sigel] at his most vulnerable — and his best." NME deemed the album as "defiant as ever". Pitchfork commented "Only two things matter here: the production, which is masterful, and Beanie himself, a virtuoso of lonely, bitter desperation." Stylus Magazine gave the album a B+ rating with an additional comment: "One of the strongest albums of 2005, Beanie Sigel stands among the greatest of the Roc-A-Fella catalogue with technical ability and an emotional severity worth experiencing." Vibe says in a review, "At times, he overreaches." While Rolling Stone scored the album at a 60 out of 100, they reviewed "The B. Coming starts strong... [and] eventually flattens out into dark, brooding territory." The B. Coming ranked number 32 as Pitchfork's Top 50 Albums of 2005 in the year end.

Commercial 
The B. Coming debuted at number three on the Billboard 200, with first-week sales of 130,000 copies. The album was two slots away from 50 Cent's The Massacre.

Track listing

Samples 
Feel It In The Air
 "Whole Lotta Something Goin On” by Raphael Ravenscroft
I Can’t Go On This Way
 "Love Me, Love Me or Leave Me, Leave Me” by Gloria Scott
Gotta Have It
 "That’s What’s Wrong With Me” by Rose Royce
Purple Rain
 "In The Rain" by The Dramatics
Oh Daddy
 "Oh Daddy" by Natalie Cole
Change
 "My First Love" by Rene and Angela
Bread & Butter
 "Proud Of You" by Johnny "Guitar" Watson
Flatline
 "Poor Abbey Walsh" by Marvin Gaye
Look At Me Now
 "Come On Down (To Get Your Head Out of the Clouds)" by Greg Perry (singer)
It’s On
 "Questions" by Carrie Lucas
Wanted (On The Run)
 "Wanted Dead Or Alive" by Bon Jovi

Charts

Weekly charts

Year-end charts

Singles chart positions

References 

Beanie Sigel albums
2005 albums
Albums produced by the Neptunes
Albums produced by Ty Fyffe
Albums produced by Just Blaze
Albums produced by DJ Scratch
Albums produced by Buckwild
Albums produced by Bink (record producer)
Roc-A-Fella Records albums
Def Jam Recordings albums